NorthWestern Corporation owns NorthWestern Energy, a utility company that serves South Dakota, Nebraska, and Montana that is based in Sioux Falls. , the company serves approximately 718,000 customers. The company's corporate headquarters are located in Sioux Falls while the headquarters for the South Dakota operations (and which was the headquarters for the old NorthWestern Public Service Company) are in Huron, South Dakota.

History 
The Montana operations (formerly known as the Montana Power Company) were acquired around 2000 after that state passed legislation allowing the electric utility industry to be 'unbundled'. Out of state investors (led by PP&L Resources) then immediately acquired the generation assets of Montana Power, leaving that part of the territory vulnerable to high "spot" prices on the energy market (creating some chronic discontent that led the Montana Public Service Commission to submit the one "no" vote that effectively nullified a potential sale of NorthWestern to Babcock & Brown Infrastructure of Australia). In 2014, NorthWestern purchased the dams that were originally part of Montana Power for $900 Million from PPL Corporation.

Controversies
In March, 2003, a class action was filed against Northwestern Corp, claiming that defendants artificially inflated the stock price through material omissions and materially false and misleading statements.  A $41 million settlement fund was established in 2005. On April 1, 2003, as a result of the ongoing evaluation and review of certain accounting entries, NorthWestern said it expects to restate prior unaudited quarterly results for the first three quarters of 2002.

In March 2009, NorthWestern Energy was involved with a gas explosion in Bozeman, Montana. The explosion destroyed several businesses and killed one person. By November, the company was sued by numerous owners of the destroyed businesses.

External links
  Official Website

References

Companies formerly listed on the New York Stock Exchange
Companies listed on the Nasdaq
Companies based in Sioux Falls, South Dakota
Companies based in South Dakota
Re-established companies
Electric power companies of the United States
Natural gas companies of the United States